A typographic approximation is a replacement of an element of the writing system (usually a glyph) with another glyph or glyphs. The replacement may be a nearly homographic character, a digraph, or a character string. An approximation is different from a typographical error in that an approximation is intentional and aims to preserve the visual appearance of the original. The concept of approximation also applies to the World Wide Web and other forms of textual information available via digital media, though usually at the level of characters, not glyphs.

Historically, the main cause of typographic approximation was a low quantity of glyphs (such as letterforms and symbols) available for printing.
In the age of World Wide Web and digital typesetting, especially after the advent of Unicode and enormous amount of computer fonts, typographic approximations are usually caused either by low ability of humans to distinguish and find needed symbols or by inadequate replacement patterns in word processors, rather than by lack of available characters.

Typewriter and line printer approximations

Merger of characters 
On typewriter, several characters were merged due to limited size of glyph repertoire. Several modern computing characters appeared by merger of different symbols, such as the "typewriter" apostrophe, ', which can denote an apostrophe proper, ’, a single quotation mark, or the prime symbol.

Non-spacing modifiers 
Some typewriters have non-spacing keys for use as diacritical marks. After the typist pushes, say, acute accent ◌́ the caret does not move. This allows the typist to overstrike this mark by a spacing letter, say, e and obtain é, an accented letter. Due to geometrical restrictions of a monospaced font, the result could not always be perfect. For example, overstriking unlikely was a feasible method to produce uppercase accented letters, such as É.

Overstrike was used on line printers for the same function.

Overstrike of the same letter was used to simulate boldface letters on line printers.

ASCII approximations 

The US-ASCII character set and other variants of ISO/IEC 646 contains 95 graphic characters. It is comparable with a (Latin script) typewriter and insufficient for a quality typography. But high availability and robustness of ASCII character encoding prompted computer users to invent ASCII substitutes for various glyphs.

The following ASCII characters are used to approximate certain characters. Note that there are many Latin letters that are homographic to letters of other scripts, however those Latin letters are not listed below.

  (space): alignment and justification.
 : various type of double quotes, double prime ″.
 : sharp symbol ♯.
 : various type of single quotes, apostrophe ’, prime ′.
  – see Asterisk.
  – various symbols with strokes extending to left, up, right and down.
  – probably an ASCII character the most used for approximations.
 : various dot-like symbols, see Full stop.
  – see Slash (punctuation).
 : Turkish dotless ı, Cyrillic palochka Ӏ.
 : IPA reversed epsilon ɜ, Cyrillic letter З.
 : Cyrillic letter Ч.
 : various non-Latin letters and symbols with similar grapheme.
  – see Colon (punctuation).
  and : chevrons ⟨ ⟩, angle quotes ‹ ›, horizontal arrows (especially as digraphs  and ).
 : line drawing horizontal double line ═ (see the image), double hyphen.
  – although not an approximation, the question sign sometimes replaces unrepresented and unrecognized characters.
  – see At sign.
 : Numero sign №.
 : various symbols with strokes extending to left, right and down, but not up.
 : set union ∪.
 : ∨.
 : X mark ✗.
  and : checkbox and similar rectangular pictograms.
 : ∧, upwards arrow ↑, and similar symbols with the wedge at the top.
  – see Underscore.
  – opening single quote ‘.
  - flat symbol ♭
 : bullets and various circle-like symbols such as ∘ and ∞ (using two consecutive characters).
 : μ — SI prefix micro- or lowercase Greek letter mu
 : downwards arrow ↓, and similar symbols with the wedge at the bottom.
 : multiplication sign ×.
  (on the image, this ASCII character is rendered as a broken bar ¦): line drawing vertical symbols.
  – see Tilde.

Approximation of non-glyphs 
There exist various approximation for typographic alignment. For example, justification may be emulated with inserting of spaces, and flush-right alignment may be done by padding with spaces.

There are various techniques for approximation of tables (historically used for text mode displays), such as box-drawing characters.

Modern situation 
In digital technologies, there are still some conditions where typographic approximations are appropriate. Some devices, such as mobile phones, cannot support huge character sets and power text formatting tools, which are ubiquitous on desktop computers of the 2000s.

References 

Typography
Typesetting